The Medic is a 1979 French film directed by Pierre Granier-Deferre, adapted from the novel Harmonie ou les horreurs de la guerre by Jean Freustié.

Plot 
The film is set during World War Three (portrayed as taking place in 1983) as battles take place between Eastern and Western forces. Behind the battle lines, in a medical unit, a surgeon falls in love with an idealistic nurse after an initially difficult meeting.

Cast 
 Alain Delon as Jean-Marie Desprée 
 Véronique Jannot as Harmony 
 Bernard Giraudeau as François 
 Francine Bergé as Marcia 
 Michel Auclair as Le patron 
 Catherine Lachens as Zoa 
 Bernard Le Coq as Gérôme

References

External links

1979 films
1979 drama films
Films directed by Pierre Granier-Deferre
Films produced by Alain Delon
Films set in the future
1970s French-language films
French war films
War romance films
Films scored by Philippe Sarde
1970s French films